Neferu (English: Beauty) was an ancient Egyptian queen of the 12th Dynasty. She was a daughter of Amenemhat I (r. 1991–1962 BC), sister-wife of Senusret I (r. 1971–1926 BC) and the mother of Amenemhat II.

Neferu III is one of the four known children of Amenemhat I. She married her brother Senusret, and was his only wife, so far as is known. She is mentioned as his wife in the Story of Sinuhe. Her name appears on fragments in her father's pyramid at Lisht and in her son's Serabit el-Khadim chapel which was built as a memorial for Senusret I. She had a pyramid in her husband's pyramid complex, but it is possible she was buried not there, but rather in Dahshur, near her son.

Her titles were: King's Daughter; King's Wife; King's Mother.

Sources

Queens consort of the Twelfth Dynasty of Egypt
20th-century BC women